Dub to Africa is a reggae album by Prince Far I.

Track listing
"Bass Ace" (3:51)
"Dub to Africa" (3:19)
"Good Music Brother" (3:35)
"Glory to God" (3:41)
"Hello, Love Brother" (5:31)
"Cry Tuff and the Originals" (3:22)
"Give Love" (3:59)
"Big Fight Dub" (4:13)
"Internal Dub" (4:07)
"Out of the Abyss" (4:02)

Personnel
Prince Far I - percussion, arrangements
Noel "Sowell" Bailey - guitar
Chinnaas Melchezinick - guitar
Errol "Flabba" Holt -  bass
Lincoln "Style" Scott - drums

Prince Far I albums
1979 albums
Dub albums